Talveila is a municipality located in the Spanish province of Soria, Castile and León. According to the 2004 census (INE), the municipality has a population of 186 inhabitants.

References

Municipalities in the Province of Soria